JS Baco is a New Caledonian football team playing at the top level. It is based in Koné.  Their home stadium is Stade Yoshida.

Achievements
New Caledonia Division Honneur: 6
 1994, 1995, 1997, 2000, 2001, 2007

New Caledonia Cup: 5
 1980, 1984, 1987, 1991, 1995

The club in the French football structure
French Cup : 1 appearance
 2006/07

Performance in OFC competitions
OFC Champions League: 1 appearance
Best: 2° in Preliminary Round 2008
2008: 2° in Preliminary Round

References
 

Football clubs in New Caledonia